Gerner is a surname of English and German origin. Notable people with the surname include:

Andreas Gerner (1698–1749), Danish naval officer
Henrik Gerner (1742–1787), Danish naval officer 
Henrik Gerner (bishop) (1629–1700), Danish Lutheran bishop
Kristian Gerner (born 1942), Swedish historian

References

Surnames of English origin
Surnames of German origin